The Lymexylidae (historically often spelled Lymexylonidae), also known as ship-timber beetles, are a family of wood-boring beetles. Lymexylidae belong to the suborder Polyphaga and are the sole member of the superfamily Lymexyloidea.

Habitat and behavior
 
Lymexylon, Elateroides, and Melittomma are pests to forest trees such as chestnut, poplar, and oak, and can be found worldwide. Some species are parasitic, causing decay in living trees and damaging timber structures such as houses and ships. Wood boring activities occur primarily in the larva stage, with the larvae damaging both sapwood and heartwood. Lymexylidae larvae bore into living and decaying wood (e.g. Chestnut, Populus, and Oak) where they consume the fungus Endomyces hylecoeti.

Symbiotic relationship with fungi
Lymexylidae larvae have a symbiotic association with certain types of fungi. The fungi grow in sheltered environments where they are tended by the larvae, such as the holes burrowed into the wood and, in return, the larvae feed on the fungi.

Specifically, this species has evolved a relationship with the yeast-like fungus Endomyces hylecoeti. Every egg the female lays is coated with fungal spores from a pouch near her ovipositor. The larvae hatch and subsequently collect some of the spores by remaining close to the egg shells for a period of time, before tunneling further into the wood. The fungi grow on the tunnel walls created by the larvae. The larvae then consume the fungus, rather than the wood itself. As the fungi require air flow to grow, the larvae ensure the tunnels are free of any debris.

Species and Genera
Lymexylidae contain the following genera:

 Atractocerus Palisot de Beauvois, 1801
 Australymexylon Wheeler, 1986
 Elateroides Schaeffer, 1766
 Lymexylon Fabricius, 1775
 Melittomma Murray, 1867
 Melittommopsis Lane, 1955
 Protomelittomma Wheeler, 1986
 Urtea Paulus, 2004
†Adamas Chen & Zhang, 2020 Burmese amber, Myanmar, Late Cretaceous (Cenomanian)
†Cratoatractocerus Wolf-Schwenninger 2011 Crato Formation, Brazil,  Early Cretaceous (Aptian)
†Cretoquadratus Chen 2019 Burmese amber, Myanmar, Cenomanian
†Ponomarenkylon Kirejtshuk 2008 Baltic amber, Eocene
†Vetatractocerus Yamamoto 2019 Burmese amber, Myanmar, Cenomanian

There are over 60 species in these genera, including:
 The ship timber beetle, Lymexylon navale
 Two species are located in Eastern US and Canada: the sapwood timberworm Elateroides lugubris (Say) and the chestnut timberworm, Melittomma sericeum

Morphology

Adult morphology: 
 long; elongate to slender, parallel-sided, vestiture consisting of fine setae; conspicuously necked to not necked; somewhat waisted.
Head short, typically narrowed behind large protruding eyes forming a slight neck; surface punctate, with or without epicranial pit.
Antennae short 11-segmented, filiform/serrate and often sexually dimorphic.
Maxillary palpi 4-segmented, simple in most females, and with apical segment modified into a complex flabellate or plumose organ in males-palporgan.
Tarsi 5-5-5 with legs slender, moderately long.
Hind-leg coxae extending laterally to meet the elytra (Lymexylon), or not markedly extended laterally (Elateroides).
Elytra individually tapered to their apices to not individually tapered; fairly short, exposing several terminal abdominal 1-3 tergites; all articulated and moveable.
Wings with fairly complete venation, radial cell short or absent.

Immature Morphology: 
Whitish-yellow, elongate, thin, cylindrical with short but well developed legs.
Prognathous, stemmata absent or present may have eye spots.
Abdominal modifications found in older larvae.

Classification
The superfamily Lymexyloidea is currently within series Cucujoidea. The internal phylogeny has not been clearly understood/completed by experts. Morphological data places the family inside the Tenebrionoidea, while molecular data place it as sister taxon to Tenebrionoidea, and polyphyletic.

See also
 Forest pathology

Notes

References
 Arnett, Ross H., et al., eds. American Beetles: Polyphaga: Scarabaeoidea through Curculionoidea. Vol. 2. CRC Press, 2002: 261-262. EBSCO printed on Sept. 21,2013.
 Casari, S.A. and Albertoni, F.F., (2013). First Instar Larva of Atractocerus brasiliensis (Lepeletier & Audinet-Serville, 1825) (Lymexylidae, Atractocerinae). Volume 53(27): 359‑372.
 Kundrata, R., Bocakova, M., & Bocak, L. (2014). The comprehensive phylogeny of the superfamily Elateroidea (Coleoptera: Elateriformia). Molecular Phylogenetics and Evolution, 76, 162-171.
 Triplehorn, Charles A., Norman F. Johnson, and Donald J. Borror. Borror and DeLong's Introduction to the Study of Insects. Belmont, CA: Thompson Brooks/Cole, 2005.
 Wheeler, Q. D. (1986). Revision of the genera of Lymexylidae (Coleoptera: Cucujiformia). Bulletin of the American Museum of Natural History, 183:113-210.

External links

 L. Watson and M. J. Dallwitz, Lymexylidae
 Lymexylidae on ITIS
A video of Atractocerus brasiliensis, a ship timber beetle in Costa Rica

 
Beetle families
Woodboring beetles

Articles containing video clips